Apionichthys seripierriae is a species of sole in the family Achiridae. It was described by Robson Tamar da Costa Ramos in 2003. It is found in the Amazon River.

The species epithet "seripierriae" was given in honour of Dione Seripierri, the head librarian at the Museum of Zoology of the University of São Paulo in Brazil.

References

Pleuronectiformes
Taxa named by Robson Tamar da Costa Ramos
Fish described in 2003